The Peța is a left tributary of the river Crișul Repede in Romania. It discharges into the Crișul Repede in Sântandrei, west of Oradea.

References

Rivers of Romania
Rivers of Bihor County